A. victoria may refer to:
 Agriocnemis victoria, a damselfly species found in Africa
 Aequorea victoria, the crystal jelly, a bioluminescent hydrozoan jellyfish species found off the west coast of North America

See also
 Victoria (disambiguation)